Sojka or Sójka is a term for Eurasian jay in some Slavic languages like Czech, Polish, Russian or Serbian. 

It may also refer to:

People
 Arkadiusz Sojka (born 1980), Polish footballer
 Gary Allan Sojka (born 1940), former president of Bucknell University
 Ján Sojka (born 1990), Slovak footballer
 Stanisław Sojka (born 1959), Polish jazz and pop singer, pianist and composer
 Trude Sojka (1909-2007), Czech-Ecuadorian artist
Zander Sojka (2005-Pres.), Wrestler

Places
 Sojka Pavilion, a sport arena in Lewisburg, Pennsylvania

Other
 Sojka III, an unmanned aerial vehicle operated by the Czech Army

See also

 
 Jay bird (disambiguation)
 Jay (disambiguation)

Slavic-language surnames
Polish-language surnames
Czech-language surnames
Slovak-language surnames